Wu Junjie (born 28 February 2002), known in Spain as Kun, is a Chinese footballer currently playing as a forward for Guangzhou

Club career
Born in Anhui, Wu started at the Evergrande Football School in Guangdong, before joining Guangzhou. After one Chinese FA Cup appearance for Guangzhou, Wu moved to Spain to join Sporting de Gijón, alongside teammates He Xinjie and Jiang Weilang. In his first season, he was assigned to the club's 'B' team in the Tercera División RFEF.

Career statistics

Club
.

References

2002 births
Living people
Footballers from Anhui
Chinese footballers
Association football forwards
Guangzhou F.C. players
Sporting de Gijón players
Sporting de Gijón B players
Tercera Federación players
Chinese expatriate footballers
Chinese expatriate sportspeople in Spain
Expatriate footballers in Spain